Brigadier Sir Norman Wilmshurst Gwatkin  (2 August 1899 – 31 July 1971) was a British Army officer and courtier in the Household of Elizabeth II.

Military career
Gwatkin was the son of Hugh Fortescue Wilmshurst Gwatkin and Vera Philpots. He was educated at Clifton College before attending the Royal Military College, Sandhurst.

He commissioned into the Coldstream Guards in 1918. He subsequently joined the Royal Household. He was invested as a Member of the Royal Victorian Order in 1937, while serving as Assistant Comptroller of the Lord Chamberlain's Office. In 1940 he was promoted to the rank of Lieutenant-Colonel. Gwatkin saw active service in the Second World War and in 1944 he was awarded the Distinguished Service Order while commanding the 5th Guards Armoured Brigade in Operation Overlord. He returned to the Royal Household after the war. Between 1950 and 1952 he served as an Extra Equerry to George VI, and held the same role in the household of Elizabeth II until his death in 1971. From 1960 to 1964 he served as Comptroller, and in 1963 he was made Knight Grand Cross of the Royal Victorian Order. Gwatkin served as Secretary and Registrar of the Order of Merit between 1963 and his death. In 1964 he was made Knight Commander of the Order of St Michael and St George.

In 1957 he married Isolen Mary June Wilson in Aldershot.

While serving in the Lord Chamberlain's Office he was responsible for a report which described the 1962 play, Under Plain Cover, as "effluent".

References

External links
Generals of World War II

1899 births
1971 deaths
British Army brigadiers of World War II
Companions of the Distinguished Service Order
English courtiers
Equerries
Graduates of the Royal Military College, Sandhurst
Knights Commander of the Order of St Michael and St George
Knights Grand Cross of the Royal Victorian Order
People educated at Clifton College
Knights Commander of the Order of Merit of the Federal Republic of Germany
Coldstream Guards officers